Love, Hate and Death is a 1989 Spanish drama film directed by Vicente Escrivá. The film was selected as the Spanish entry for the Best Foreign Language Film at the 62nd Academy Awards, but did not win.

Cast
 Cristina Hoyos as María la Taranto
 Sancho Gracia as Antonio Montoya
 Juan Paredes as Manuel Taranto
 Esperanza Campuzano as Ana Montoya
 Juan Antonio Jiménez as Mercucho
 José Sancho as Teo el Picao
 Mercedes Sampietro as Soledad
 Queta Claver as Ama

See also
 List of submissions to the 62nd Academy Awards for Best Foreign Language Film
 List of Spanish submissions for the Academy Award for Best Foreign Language Film

References

External links
 

1989 films
1989 drama films
Spanish drama films
1980s Spanish-language films
Films directed by Vicente Escrivá
1980s Spanish films